Fairdealing is an unincorporated community and census-designated place located in northeastern Ripley County in southeastern Missouri, United States. As of the 2020 census, the community had a population of 543.

A post office has been in operation at Fairdealing since 1883. Several traditions attempt to explain the name.

Demographics

References

Census-designated places in Ripley County, Missouri
Census-designated places in Missouri
Unincorporated communities in Ripley County, Missouri
Unincorporated communities in Missouri